Margherita Vicario (born 13 February 1988) is an Italian singer, songwriter and actress.

Biography
She is the daughter of Italian director Francesco Vicario and the granddaughter of Marco Vicario and Rossana Podestà.

She debuted with a minor role in Woody Allen's To Rome with Love (2012) and appeared in several Italian TV series such as I Cesaroni, R.I.S. Roma – Delitti imperfetti, Caccia al Re – La narcotici and Carlo & Malik.

As a singer-songwriter, she released her debut single "Nota bene" in 2013. Her first studio album Minimal Musical was released in 2014.

Discography

Studio albums

Extexed plays

Singles

As lead artist

As featured artist

Guest appearances

Filmography

Films

Television

References

External links
 Margherita Vicario at mymovies.it
 

Italian actresses
Italian pop singers
21st-century Italian singers
Italian women singer-songwriters
Italian singer-songwriters
1988 births
Living people
21st-century Italian women singers